Erin Hoare (born 17 July 1989) is an Australian netballer. At , Hoare is primarily a goal shooter, but can also play goal attack. Hoare is a member of the NSW Swifts and plays in the ANZ Championship.

Netball career 
Beginning her career with the Melbourne Vixens in 2013, Hoare was primarily a bench player, earning two ANZ Championship caps during her time at the club. In 2014, Hoare with the Melbourne Vixens won the ANZ Championship premiership.

At the end of the 2014 ANZ Championship season, it was announced that Hoare would be leaving the Melbourne Vixens to join the NSW Swifts for the 2015 ANZ Championship season. Hoare joins Caitlin Thwaites, Susan Pratley and Stephanie Wood as the shooters for the NSW Swifts. At 194 cm, Hoare is the tallest of the NSW Swifts shooters and one of the tallest players in the ANZ Championship.

Accolades 
 2013 Melbourne Vixens Coaches' Award
 2013-14 Australian Netball League Premiers (with Victorian Fury)
 2014 ANZ Championship Premiers (with Melbourne Vixens)
 2012 Victorian Fury ANL team
 2012 Victorian Netball League Team of the Year
 Geelong Cougars Best and Fairest (2012)

Australian rules football 

In May 2018 Hoare accepted an offer from expansion club  to play with the club in the 2019 AFLW season.

Hoare announced her retirement from the AFLW following the 2019 season.

Academic career 
Hoare completed her PhD in Public Health/Psychology at Deakin University in 2016, and has worked as Australian Rotary Postdoctoral Research Fellow at the WHO Collaborating Centre for Obesity Prevention at Deakin University and the Baker Heart and Diabetes Institute, in Victoria, Australia. She has published a number of papers on epidemiology of lifestyle factors for physical and mental health outcomes using large datasets, especially relating to adolescents, depression and obesity in Australia.

References

External links 

NSW Swifts profile
Melbourne Vixens Profile

Australian netball players
New South Wales Swifts players
Melbourne Vixens players
Melbourne Football Club (AFLW) players
Australian rules footballers from Victoria (Australia)
1989 births
Living people
Geelong Football Club (AFLW) players
Victorian Netball League players
Netball players from Victoria (Australia)
Victorian Fury players
Australian Netball League players